Carl Jamissen (12 June 1910 – 10 December 1990) was a Norwegian footballer. He played in three matches for the Norway national football team in 1935.

References

External links
 

1910 births
1990 deaths
Norwegian footballers
Norway international footballers
Place of birth missing
Association footballers not categorized by position